The Burmese Horse or Bama Myinn is a breed of horse from Myanmar (Burma). It is one of two horse breeds in Myanmar, the other being the Shan Horse.

History 

The Burmese Horse is one of two horse breeds in Myanmar, the other being the Shan Horse. The two are sometimes treated as synonyms, but are separately reported to DAD-IS by the Livestock Breeding and Veterinary Department of the Ministry of Livestock, Fisheries and Rural Development of Myanmar.

The population of the Burmese breed was last reported to DAD-IS in 1991, when there were 26 000 breeding mares. In 2007 its conservation status was recorded by the FAO as "not at risk".

Characteristics

The Burmese Horse is well adapted to hot and humid conditions. Its coat is not as thick as that of the Shan Horse. It is used as a draught horse.

References

Horse breeds originating in Myanmar